The Oluvil Harbour is a commercial and fishery harbour located in Ampara District, Eastern Province, Sri Lanka. The port was opened on 1 September 2013, its construction having begun in 2008 under the Nagenahira Navodaya programme.

Simultaneously, the commercial harbour has enough depth to handle ships up to 5,000 metric tons and the fishery harbour can hold more than 250 fishing boats.

The Port Authority, Naval Ministry and the Ministry of Fisheries launched a project to upgrade the harbour to accommodate larger fishing vessels in 2015.

References

Economy of Ampara District
Ports and harbours of Sri Lanka
Transport in Ampara District